Karpman is a surname. Notable people with the surname include:

Benjamin Karpman (1886–1962), American psychiatrist
Laura Karpman (born 1959), American composer
Stephen B. Karpman, American psychologist, author of The Karpman drama triangle. Son of Benjamin Karpman.

See also
 Karman

Surnames of Greek origin